The following is a partial list of currently operating state schools in the unitary council area of Inverclyde, Midlothian, Moray, North Ayrshire, North Lanarkshire, Orkney Islands, Perth and Kinross and Renfrewshire in Scotland, United Kingdom.

Inverclyde

Nursery schools
Binnie Street Children's Centre, Gourock
Blairmore Nursery School, Greenock
Bluebird Family Centre, Greenock
Gibshill Children's Centre, Greenock
Glenbrae Children's Centre, Greenock
Glenpark Early Learning Centre, Greenock
Hillend Children's Centre, Greenock
Larkfield Children's Centre, Greenock
Newark Nursery School, Port Glasgow
Rainbow Family Centre, Port Glasgow
Wellpark Children's Centre, Greenock

Primary schools
Aileymill Primary School, Greenock
All Saints Primary School, Greenock
Ardgowan Primary School, Greenock
Gourock Primary School, Gourock
Inverkip Primary School, Greenock
Kilmacolm Primary School, Kilmacolm
King's Oak Primary School, Greenock
Lady Alice Primary School, Greenock
Moorfoot Primary School, Gourock
Newark Primary School, Port Glasgow
St. Andrew's Primary School, Greenock
St. Francis' Primary School, Port Glasgow
St. John's Primary School, Port Glasgow
St. Joseph's Primary School, Greenock
St. Mary's Primary School, Greenock
St. Michael's Primary School, Port Glasgow
St. Ninian's Primary School, Gourock
St. Patrick's Primary School, Greenock
Wemyss Bay Primary School, Wemyss Bay
Whinhill Primary School, Greenock

Secondary schools
Clydeview Academy, Gourock
Inverclyde Academy, Greenock
Notre Dame High School, Greenock
Port Glasgow High School, Port Glasgow
St. Columba's High School, Gourock
St. Stephen's High School, Port Glasgow

Special schools
Craigmarloch School, Port Glasgow
Garvel School, Greenock
Lomond View Academy, Greenock

Midlothian

Nursery schools
Mayfield Nursery School, Dalkeith
Mount Esk Nursery School, Bonnyrigg

Primary schools
Bliston Primary School, Roslin
Bonnyrigg Primary School, Bonnyrigg
Burnbrae Primary School, Bonnyrigg
Cornbank St James' Primary School, Penicuik
Cuiken Primary School, Penicuik
Danderhall Primary School, Dalkeith
Gore Glen Primary School, Gorebridge
Gorebridge Primary School, Gorebridge
Hawthornden Primary School, Bonnyrigg
King's Park Primary School, Dalkeith
Lasswade Primary School, Bonnyrigg
Lawfield Primary School, Dalkeith
Loanhead Primary School, Loanhead
Mauricewood Primary School, Penicuik
Mayfield Primary School, Dalkeith
Moorfoot Primary School, Gorebridge
Newtongrange Primary School, Newtongrange
Paradykes Primary School, Loanhead
Rosewell Primary School, Rosewell
Roslin Primary School, Roslin
Sacred Heart Primary School, Penicuik
St. Andrew's Primary School, Gorebridge
St. David's R.C. Primary School, Dalkeith
St. Luke's Primary School, Mayfield
St. Mary's Primary School, Bonnyrigg
St. Matthew's Primary School, Rosewell
Stobhill Primary School, Gorebridge
Strathesk Primary School, Penicuik
Tynewater Primary School, Pathhead 
Woodburn Primary School, Woodburn

Secondary schools
Beeslack High School, Penicuik
Dalkeith High School, Dalkeith
Lasswade High School Centre, Bonnyrigg
Newbattle High School, Dalkeith
Penicuik High School, Penicuik
St. David's R.C. High School, Dalkeith

Special schools
Saltersgate School, Dalkeith
Support & Reintegration Services, Gowkshill
Wellington Residential School, Penicuik

Moray

Primary schools
Aberlour Primary School, Aberlour
Alves Primary School, Alves
Andersons Primary School, Forres
Applegrove Primary School, Forres
Bishopmill Primary School, Elgin
Botriphnie Primary School, Drummuir
Burghead Primary School, Burghead
Cluny Primary School, Buckie
Craigellachie Primary School, Craigellachie 
Crossroads Primary School, Grange
Cullen Primary School, Cullen 
Dallas Primary School, Dallas 
Dyke Primary School, Dyke 
East End Primary School, Elgin
Findochty Primary School, Findochty
Glenlivet Primary School, Ballindalloch
Greenwards Primary School, Elgin
Hopeman Primary School, Hopeman
Hythehill Primary School, Lossiemouth
Keith Primary School, Keith
Kinloss Primary School, Kinloss
Knockando Primary School, Knockando
Lhanbryde Primary School, Lhanbryde
Linkwood Primary School, Elgin
Logie Primary School, Dunphail
Millbank Primary School, Buckie
Milne's Primary School, Fochabers
Mortlach Primary School, Dufftown
Mosstodloch Primary School, Mosstodloch
Mosstowie Primary School, Miltonduff
New Elgin Primary School, Elgin
Newmill Primary School, Newmill
Pilmuir Primary School, Forres
Portessie Primary School, Portessie
Portgordon Primary School, Portgordon
Portknockie Primary School, Portknockie
Rothes Primary School, Rothes
Rothiemay Primary School, Milltown of Rothiemay
Seafield Primary School, Elgin
St. Gerardine Primary School, Lossiemouth
St. Peter's R.C. Primary School, Buckie
St. Sylvester's R.C. Primary School, Elgin
St. Thomas' R.C. Primary School, Keith
Tomintoul Primary School, Ballindalloch
West End Primary School, Elgin

Secondary schools
Buckie High School, Buckie
Elgin Academy, Elgin
Elgin High School, Elgin
Forres Academy, Forres
Keith Grammar School, Keith
Lossiemouth High School, Lossiemouth
Milne's High School, Fochabers
Speyside High School, Aberlour

North Ayrshire

Nursery schools
Castlepark Early Years Centre, Irvine
Dalry Early Years Centre, Dalry
Garnock Valley Early Years Centre, Kilbirnie
Kilwinning Early Years Centre, Kilwinning
Springvale Early Years Centre, Saltcoats

Primary schools
Abbey Primary School, Kilwinning
Annick Primary School, Irvine
Ardeer Primary School, Stevenston
Beith Primary School, Beith
Blacklands Primary School, Kilwinning
Brodick Primary School, Brodick (Isle of Arran)
Caledonia Primary School, Saltcoats
Castlepark Primary School, Irvine
Corrie Primary School, Corrie (Arran)
Corsehill Primary School, Kilwinning
Cumbrae Primary School, Millport (Great Cumbrae)
Dalry Primary School, Dalry
Dreghorn Primary School, Dreghorn
Dykesmains Primary School, Saltcoats
Elderbank Primary School, Irvine
Fairlie Primary School, Largs
Garnock Community Campus, Glengarnock
Gateside Primary School, Beith
Glebe Primary School, Irvine
Glencairn Primary School, Stevenston
Hayocks Primary School, Stevenston
Kilmory Primary School, Kilmory (Arran)
Lamlash Primary School, Lamlash (Arran)
Largs Primary School, Largs
Lawthorn Primary School, Irvine
Loudoun-Montgomery Primary School, Irvine
Mayfield Primary School, Saltcoats
Moorpark Primary School, Kilbirnie
Pennyburn Primary School, Kilwinning
Pirnmill Primary School, Pirnmill (Arran)
Shiskine Primary School, Shiskine (Arran)
Skelmorlie Primary School, Skelmorlie
Springside Primary School, Springside
St. Anthony's Primary School, Saltcoats
St. Bridget's Primary School, Kilbirnie
St. John Ogilvie Primary School, Irvine
St. John's Primary School, Stevenston
St. Luke's Primary School, Kilwinning
St. Mark's Primary School, Irvine
St. Mary's Primary School, Largs
St. Palladius' Primary School, Dalry
St. Peter's Primary School, Ardrossan
St. Winning's Primary School, Kilwinning
Stanley Primary School, Ardrossan
West Kilbride Primary School, West Kilbride
Whitehirst Park Primary School, Kilwinning
Whiting Bay Primary School, Whiting Bay (Arran)
Winton Primary School, Ardrossan
Woodlands Primary School, Irvine

Secondary schools
Ardrossan Academy, Ardrossan
Arran High School, Lamlash, Isle of Arran
Auchenharvie Academy, Stevenston
Garnock Community Campus, Glengarnock
Greenwood Academy, Dreghorn
Irvine Royal Academy, Irvine
Kilwinning Academy, Kilwinning
Largs Academy, Largs
St Matthew's Academy, Saltcoats

Special schools
Haysholm School, Irvine
James McFarlane School, Ardrossan
James Reid School, Saltcoats
Stanecastle School, Irvine

North Lanarkshire

Nursery schools
Ailsa Family Learning Centre, Motherwell
Bellshill Family Learning Centre, Bellshill
Craigneuk Family Learning Centre, Craigneuk
Devonview Family Learning Centre, Airdrie
Dunbeth Family Learning Centre, Coatbridge
Forgewood Family Learning Centre, Forgewood
Jigsaw Family Learning Centre, Muirhead
Kildrum Family Learning Centre, Kildrum
Laburnum Family Learning Centre, Viewpark
Newmains Family Learning Centre, Newmains
Richard Stewart Family Learning Centre, Airdrie
Shawhead Family Learning Centre, Coatbridge
Shotts Family Learning Centre, Shotts
St Patrick's Family Learning Centre, Kilsyth
Stepping Stones Family Learning Centre, Stepps
Wishaw Family Learning Centre, Wishaw

Primary schools
Abronhill Primary School, Cumbernauld
Aitkenhead Primary School, Birkenshaw
Alexander Peden Primary School, Harthill
All Saints Primary School, Airdrie
Allanton Primary School, Shotts
Auchinloch Primary School, Auchinloch
Baird Memorial Primary School, Cumbernauld
Balmalloch Primary School, Kilsyth
Banton Primary School, Banton
Bargeddie Primary School, Bargeddie
Berryhill Primary School, Craigneuk
Calderbank Primary School, Calderbank 
Calderbridge Primary School, Coltness 
Cambusnethan Primary School, Cambusnethan
Carbrain Primary School, Cumbernauld
Carnbroe Primary School, Carnbroe 
Cathedral Primary School, Motherwell
Chapelgreen Primary School, Queenzieburn
Chapelhall Primary School, Chapelhall
Chapelside Primary School, Airdrie
Christ the King Primary School, Holytown
Chryston Primary School, Chryston
Clarkston Primary School, Airdrie
Cleland Primary School, Cleland
Condorrat Primary School, Condorrat 
Corpus Christi Primary School, Calderbank
Cumbernauld Primary School, Cumbernauld
Dykehead Primary School, Shotts
Eastfield Primary School, Cumbernauld
Gartcosh Primary School, Gartcosh
Glenboig Primary School, Glenboig
Glencairn Primary School, Motherwell
Glengowan Primary School, Caldercruix
Glenmanor Primary School, Moodiesburn
Golfhill Primary School, Airdrie
Greengairs Primary School, Greengairs
Greenhill Primary School, Coatbridge
Hilltop Primary School, Airdrie
Holy Cross Primary School, Croy
Holy Family Primary School, Bellshill
Holytown Primary School, Holytown
Keir Hardie Memorial Primary School, Newarthill
Kildrum Primary School, Cumbernauld
Kilsyth Primary School, Kilsyth
Kirk O'Shotts Primary School, Salsburgh
Kirkshaws Primary School, Coatbridge
Knowetop Primary School, Motherwell
Ladywell Primary School, Motherwell
Langloan Primary School, Coatbridge
Lawmuir Primary School, Bellshill
Logans Primary School, Motherwell
Morningside Primary School, Morningside
Mossend Primary School, Mossend
Muir Street Primary School, Motherwell
Muirhouse Primary School, Muirhouse 
Netherton Primary School, Netherton 
New Monkland Primary School, Glenmavis
New Stevenston Primary School, New Stevenston
Newarthill Primary School, Newarthill
Newmains Primary School, Newmains
Noble Primary School, Bellshill
Old Monkland Primary School, Coatbridge
Orchard Primary School, Overtown 
Our Lady & St Francis Primary School, Carfin
Our Lady & St Joseph's Primary School, Glenboig
Plains Primary School, Plains
Ravenswood Primary School, Cumbernauld
Rochsolloch Primary School, Airdrie
Sacred Heart Primary School, Bellshill
Shawhead Primary School, Coatbridge
Sikeside Primary School, Coatbridge
St. Aidan's Primary School, Coltness 
St. Aloysius' Primary School, Chapelhall
St. Andrew's Primary School, Airdrie
St. Andrew's Primary School, Cumbernauld
St. Augustine's Primary School, Coatbridge
St. Barbara's Primary School, Muirhead
St. Bartholomew's Primary School, Coatbridge
St. Bernadette's Primary School, Motherwell
St. Bernard's Primary School, Coatbridge
St. Brendan's Primary School, Muirhouse
St. Brigid's Primary School, Newmains
St. David's Primary School, Plains
St. Dominic's Primary School, Airdrie
St. Edward's Primary School, Airdrie
St. Gerard's Primary School, Bellshill
St. Helen's Primary School, Condorrat
St. Ignatius' Primary School, Wishaw 
St. John Paul II Primary School, Viewpark
St. Joseph's Primary School, Stepps
St. Kevin's Primary School, Bargeddie
St. Lucy's Primary School, Cumbernauld
St. Margaret of Scotland Primary School, Cumbernauld
St. Mary's Primary School, Airdrie
St. Mary's Primary School, Cleland
St. Mary's Primary School, Cumbernauld
St. Mary's Primary School, Coatbridge
St. Michael's Primary School, Moodiesburn
St. Monica's Primary School, Coatbridge
St. Patrick's Primary School, New Stevenston
St. Patrick's Primary School, Coatbridge
St. Patrick's Primary School, Kilsyth
St. Patrick's Primary School, Shotts
St. Serf's Primary School, Airdrie
St. Stephen's Primary School, Coatbridge
St. Teresa's Primary School, Newarthill
St. Thomas' Primary School, Wishaw
St. Timothy's Primary School, Coatbridge
Stane Primary School, Shotts
Stepps Primary School, Stepps
Tannochside Primary School, Tannochside
Thornlie Primary School, Wishaw
Tollbrae Primary School, Airdrie
Townhead Primary School, Coatbridge
Victoria Primary School, Airdrie
Westfield Primary School, Cumbernauld
Whitelees Primary School, Cumbernauld
Wishaw Academy Primary School, Wishaw
Woodlands Primary School, Cumbernauld

Secondary schools
Airdrie Academy, Airdrie
Bellshill Academy, Bellshill
Braidhurst High School, Motherwell
Brannock High School, Newarthill
Calderhead High School, Shotts
Caldervale High School, Airdrie
Cardinal Newman High School, Bellshill
Chryston High School, Chryston
Clyde Valley High School, Wishaw 
Coatbridge High School, Coatbridge
Coltness High School, Wishaw
Cumbernauld Academy, Cumbernauld
Dalziel High School, Motherwell
Greenfaulds High School, Cumbernauld
Kilsyth Academy, Kilsyth
Our Lady's High School, Cumbernauld
Our Lady's High School, Motherwell
St Aidan's High School, Wishaw
St. Ambrose High School, Coatbridge
St. Andrew's High School, Coatbridge
St. Margaret's High School, Airdrie
St. Maurice's High School, Cumbernauld
Taylor High School, New Stevenston

Special schools
Bothwellpark High School, Motherwell
Buchanan High School, Coatbridge
Clydeview School and Nursery, Motherwell
Drumpark School, Bargeddie
Fallside Secondary School, Viewpark
Firpark Primary School, Motherwell
Glencryan School, Cumbernauld
Mavisbank School, Airdrie
Pentland School, Coatbridge
Portland High School, Coatbridge
Redburn School, Cumbernauld
Willowbank School, Coatbridge

Orkney Islands

Primary schools
Burray Primary School, Burray
Dounby Primary School, Dounby
Eday Primary School, Eday
Evie Primary School, Evie
Firth Primary School, Finstown
Glaitness Primary School, Kirkwall
Hope Primary School, St. Margaret's Hope
North Walls Community School, Hoy
Orphir Primary School, Orphir
Papa Westray Primary School, Papa Westray
Papdale Primary School, Kirkwall
Rousay Primary School, Rousay
Sanday Community School, Sandy (age 3–16 years)
St. Andrew's Primary School, Toab
Shapinsay Primary School, Shapinsay
Stenness Primary School, Stenness
Stromness Primary School, Stromness
Stronsay Junior High School, Stronsay (age 3–16 years)
Westray Junior High School, Westray (age 3–16 years)

Secondary schools
Kirkwall Grammar School, Kirkwall
Sanday Community School, Sandy (age 3–16 years)
Stromness Academy, Stromness
Stronsay Junior High School, Stronsay (age 3–16 years)
Westray Junior High School, Westray (age 3–16 years)

Special schools
Glaitness Aurrida School, Kirkwall

Perth and Kinross

Nursery schools
Breadalbane Academy (nursery), Aberfeldy
City of Perth Early Childhood Centre, Perth
Community School of Auchterarder (nursery), Auchterarder 
Pitlochry High School (nursery), Pitlochry 
St John's Academy (nursery), Perth

Primary schools
Abernethy Primary School, Abernethy
Abernyte Primary School, Inchture
Aberuthven Primary School, Aberuthven
Alyth Primary School, Alyth
Arngask Primary School, Glenfarg
Auchtergaven Primary School, Bankfoot
Balbeggie Primary School, Balbeggie
Balhousie Primary School, Perth
Blackford Primary School, Blackford
Blair Atholl Primary School, Bridge of Tilt
Braco Primary School, Braco
Breadalbane Academy (primary), Aberfeldy
Burrelton Primary School, Burrelton
Cleish Primary School, Kinross
Collace Primary School, Kinrossie
Comrie Primary School, Comrie
Community School of Auchterarder (primary), Auchterarder
Coupar Angus Primary School, Coupar Angus
Craigie Primary School, Perth
Crieff Primary School, Crieff
Dunbarney Primary School, Bridge of Earn
Dunning Primary School, Dunning
Errol Primary School, Errol
Forgandenny Primary School, Forgandenny
Fossoway Primary School, Kinross
Glendelvine Primary School, Caputh
Glenlyon Primary School, Aberfeldy
Goodlyburn Primary School, Perth
Grandtully Primary School, Pitlochry
Guildtown Primary School, Perth
Inch View Primary School, Perth
Inchture Primary School, Inchture
Invergowrie Primary School, Invergowrie
Kenmore Primary School, Kenmore
Kettins Primary School, Kettins
Kinloch Rannoch Primary School, Kinloch Rannoch
Kinnoull Primary School, Perth
Kinross Primary School, Kinross
Kirkmichael Primary School, Kirkmichael
Letham Primary School, Perth
Logiealmond Primary School, Perth
Logierait Primary School, Pitlochry
Longforgan Primary School, Longforgan
Luncarty Primary School, Luncarty
Madderty Primary School, Crieff
Meigle Primary School, Meigle
Methven Primary School, Methven
Milnathort Primary School, Milnathort
Moncreiffe Primary School, Perth
Murthly Primary School, Murthly
Muthill Primary School, Muthill
Newhill Primary School, Blairgowrie
North Muirton Primary School, Perth
Oakbank Primary School, Perth
Our Lady's R.C. Primary School, Perth
Pitcairn Primary School, Almondbank
Pitlochry High School (primary), Pitlochry
Portmoak Primary School, Kinross
Rattray Primary School, Blairgowrie
Robert Douglas Memorial Primary School, Scone
Royal School of Dunkeld Primary School, Dunkeld
Ruthvenfield Primary School, Perth
St. Dominic's R.C. Primary School, Crieff
St. John's R.C. Academy (primary), Perth
St. Madoes Primary School, Glencarse
St. Ninian's Episcopal Primary School, Perth
St. Stephen's R.C. Primary School, Blairgowrie
Stanley Primary School, Stanley, Perthshire
Tulloch Primary School, Perth
Viewlands Primary School, Perth

Secondary schools
Bertha Park High School, Perth
Blairgowrie High School, Blairgowrie
Breadalbane Academy, Aberfeldy
Community School of Auchterarder, Auchterarder
Crieff High School, Crieff
Kinross High School, Kinross
Perth Academy, Perth
Perth Grammar School, Perth
Perth High School, Perth
Pitlochry High School, Pitlochry
St John's Academy, Perth

Special schools

Fairview School, Perth

Renfrewshire

Nursery schools
Douglas Street Early Learning and Childcare Centre, Paisley
Ferguslie Early Learning and Childcare Centre, Ferguslie Park 
Foxlea Early Learning and Childcare Centre, Foxbar
Glenburn Early Learning and Childcare Centre, Glenburn
Glendee Early Learning and Childcare Centre, Renfrew
Glenfield Early Learning and Childcare Centre, Paisley
Hillview Early Learning and Childcare Centre, Paisley
Hugh Smiley Early Learning and Childcare Centre, Paisley
Moorpark Early Learning and Childcare Centre, Renfrew
Paisley Early Learning and Childcare Centre, Paisley
Riverbrae Early Learning and Childcare Centre, Linwood
Spateston Early Learning and Childcare Centre, Johnstone
West Johnstone Early Learning and Childcare Centre, Johnstone

Primary schools
Arkleston Primary School, Renfrew
Auchenlodment Primary School, Johnstone
Bargarran Primary School, Erskine
Barsail Primary School, Erskine
Bishopton Primary School, Bishopton
Brediland Primary School, Paisley
Bridge of Weir Primary School, Bridge of Weir
Bushes Primary School, Paisley
Cochrane Castle Primary School, Johnstone
Dargavel Primary School, Bishopton
East Fulton Primary School, Linwood
Fordbank Primary School, Johnstone
Gallowhill Primary School, Paisley
Glencoats Primary School, Ferguslie Park
Heriot Primary School, Paisley
Houston Primary School, Houston
Howwood Primary School, Howwood
Inchinnan Primary School, Inchinnan
Kilbarchan Primary School, Kilbarchan
Kirklandneuk Primary School, Renfrew
Langbank Primary School, Langbank
Langcraigs Primary School, Paisley
Lochfield Primary School, Paisley
Lochwinnoch Primary School, Lochwinnoch
Mossvale Primary School, Paisley
Newmains Primary School, Renfrew
Our Lady of Peace Primary School, Linwood
Ralston Primary School, Ralston
Rashielea Primary School, Erskine
St. Anne's Primary School, Erskine
St. Anthony's Primary School, Johnstone
St. Catherine's Primary School, Paisley
St. Charles' Primary School, Paisley
St. David's Primary School, Johnstone
St. Fergus' Primary School, Paisley
St. Fillan's Primary School, Houston
St. James' Primary School, Paisley
St. James' Primary School, Renfrew
St. John Bosco Primary School, Erskine
St. John Ogilvie Primary School, Paisley
St. Margaret's Primary School, Johnstone
St. Mary's Primary School, Paisley
St. Paul's Primary School, Paisley
St. Peter's Primary School, Paisley
Thorn Primary School, Johnstone
Todholm Primary School, Paisley
Wallace Primary School, Elderslie
West Primary School, Paisley
Williamsburgh Primary School, Paisley
Woodlands Primary School, Linwood

Secondary schools
Castlehead High School, Paisley
Gleniffer High School, Paisley
Gryffe High School, Houston
Johnstone High School, Johnstone
Linwood High School, Linwood
Paisley Grammar School, Paisley
Park Mains High School, Erskine
Renfrew High School, Renfrew
St Andrew's Academy, Paisley
St Benedict's Roman Catholic High School, Linwood
Trinity High School, Renfrew

Special schools
Mary Russell School, Paisley
Riverbrae School, Linwood

Other schools in Scotland
List of independent schools in Scotland
List of state schools in Scotland (city council areas)
List of state schools in Scotland (council areas excluding cities, A–D)
List of state schools in Scotland (council areas excluding cities, E–H)
List of state schools in Scotland (council areas excluding cities, S–W)

See also
Education in the United Kingdom
Education in Scotland
Education Scotland

References

External links
The website Friends Reunited has a large index of schools but it is not possible to readily distinguish as to which schools are currently operating or closed.
The website UK Schools & Colleges Database lists currently operating state (and some independent) schools by Local Education Authority and also links to websites of individual schools where available.

I-R
State schools
Schools in Scotland by council area